Tefé Airport  is the airport serving Tefé, Brazil. It is named after Orlando Marinho (1925-2018), a former mayor of Tefé. 

It is operated by Vinci SA.

History
Operated by Infraero since 1980, on April 7, 2021 Vinci SA won a 30-year concession to operate the airport.

Airlines and destinations

Accidents and incidents

Incident
15 December 1994: a TABA Embraer EMB 110 Bandeirante en route from Carauari and Tefé to Manaus was hijacked by two Colombian citizens. The passengers were released in the proximity of Tabatinga and the aircraft was flown to Colombia. The crew was released at the Brazilian Embassy in Bogotá.

Access

See also

List of airports in Brazil

References

External links

Airports in Amazonas (Brazilian state)
1980 establishments in Brazil
Airports established in 1980
Tefé